Zhao'an railway station is a railway station located in Fujian Province, People's Republic of China, on the Xiamen–Shenzhen railway which is operated by Nanchang Railway Bureau, China Railway Corporation.

Railway stations in Fujian